Gwalpara is one of the administrative divisions of Madhepura district in the Indian state of  Bihar. The block headquarters are located at a distance of 23 km from the district headquarters, namely, at Madhepura.

Geography
Gwalpara is located at

Panchayats
Panchayats in Gwalpara community development block are: Reshna, Jhitkiya kalhot, Birgaon chatra, Sukhasan, Temabhela, Sahpur, Gualpara, Sarauni, Khokhsi, Jhalari, Pirnagar and Bisbari.

Demographics
In the 2001 census Gwalpara Block had a population of 95,295.

Education
At Gwalpara there are a renowned high school and a middle school named Madhuram Rajkiya Krit Uchh Vidyalaya is upgraded to "Madhyam(+2) high school and Madhuram Rajkiya Krit Madhya Vidyalaya.

References

Community development blocks in Madhepura district